The 1994 season was Shimizu S-Pulse's third season in existence and their second season in the J1 League. The club also competed in the Emperor's Cup and the J.League Cup. The team finished the season fourth in the league.

Review and events

League results summary

League results by round

Competitions

Domestic results

J.League

Suntory series

NICOS series

Emperor's Cup

J.League Cup

Player statistics

 † player(s) joined the team after the opening of this season.

Transfers

In:

Out:

Transfers during the season

In
Djalminha (on September)

Out
Hisashi Katō (to Verdy Kawasaki)
Sidmar (on October)

Awards
none

References

Other pages
 J. League official site
 Shimizu S-Pulse official site

Shimizu S-Pulse
Shimizu S-Pulse seasons